Rosenbluth is a German ornamental surname, which means "rose bloom", from the Middle High German rosenbluota. Variants of the name include Rosenblith, Rosenblut, Rosenblüth, and Rosenblueth. The name may refer to:

Eric Rosenblith (1920–2010), American violinist
Felix Rosenblüth (1887–1978), Israeli politician
Jerzy W. Rozenblit (born 1956), American electrical engineer
Jorge Rosenblut (born 1952), Chilean engineer
Lennie Rosenbluth (born 1933), American basketball player
Marshall Rosenbluth (1927–2003), American physicist
Walter A. Rosenblith (1913–2002), American biophysicist
 Marvin Rosenbluth (1923-2006), NASA Satellite Engineer
Marty Rosenbluth (Born 1959), American Immigration Attorney and civil rights activist

See also
Rosenbaum
Rosenblatt
Rosenblum

References 

German-language surnames
Jewish surnames
Yiddish-language surnames